Facundo Nahuel Stable (born 2 July 1995) is an Argentine professional footballer who plays as a right winger for Unión Magdalena.

Club career
Stable began his career in his country's third tier with Colegiales. He made his professional bow during the 2013–14 Primera B Metropolitana season against Villa Dálmine, replacing Ramiro Fergonzi late on in a 2–1 victory on 7 December 2013; Stable scored his first senior goal versus the same opponents in the succeeding May. A total of seventy-six appearances arrived in six seasons, along with five further goals for them; three of which were scored in separate games with Barracas Central. In January 2018, Stable completed a loan move to Primera B Nacional side Deportivo Riestra. Two appearances followed.

International career
In 2016, Stable trained with the Argentina U23s in preparation for the Sait Nagjee Trophy; though didn't make the final squad after Colegiales withdrew him.

Career statistics
.

References

External links

1995 births
Living people
Argentine footballers
Argentine expatriate footballers
Place of birth missing (living people)
Association football midfielders
Primera B Metropolitana players
Primera Nacional players
Club Atlético Colegiales (Argentina) players
Deportivo Riestra players
Barracas Central players
Unión Magdalena footballers
Argentine expatriate sportspeople in Colombia
Expatriate footballers in Colombia